Bagodar is a village in the Bagodar CD block in the Bagodar-Saria subdivision of the Giridih district in the Indian state of Jharkhand.

Geography

Location

Area overview
Giridih district is a part of the Chota Nagpur plateau, with rocky soil and extensive forests. Most of the rivers in the district flow from the west to east, except in the northern portion where the rivers flow north and north west. The district has coal and mica mines. It is an overwhelmingly rural district with small pockets of urbanisation.

Note: The map alongside presents some of the notable locations in the district. All places marked in the map are linked in the larger full screen map.

Demographics
According to the 2011 Census of India, Bagodar had a total population of 9,934, of which 5,124 (52%) were males and 4,810 (48%) were females. Population in the age range 0–6 years was 1,804. The total number of literate persons in Bagodar was 5,569 (68.50% of the population over 6 years).

Civic administration

Police station
Bagodar police station has jurisdiction over the Bagodar CD block. According to old British records, Bagodar PS was opened in 1838, following the opening of the Grand Trunk Road.

CD Block HQ
The headquarters of the Bagodar CD block are located at Bagodar village.

Transport
NH 19 (old numbering NH 2)/ Grand Trunk Road and the Hazaribagh town-Hazaribagh Road railway station road pass through Bagodar.

Economy
Banks

 State Bank of India
 Bank of India
 Jharkhand Rajya Gramin Bank
 Co-operative Bank
 UCO Bank
 United Bank Of India
 Bank of Baroda 
 Punjab National Bank
Allahabad Bank Aoura
 ESAF Small Finance Bank

Education
Ram Krishna Vivekananda College of Education was established at Bagodar in 2009. Affiliated to Vinoba Bhave University, it offers courses in arts, science, commerce and education.
 Govt Teachers Training College
 High School Bagodar
 Gyanodya Public School, Bagodar
 Children's Guide Academy School, Bagodar
 Primary Girls' School, Bagodar (Niche Bazaar)
 Govt. Basic School, Bagodar
 Girls' High School
 Beko High School (Gopald)
 Arun Kumar Memorial School Residential 
 Model School
 Ghaghra Inter Science College
 Swami Dayanand Residential School Krishna Nagar, Bagodar
 J.C. Bose High School (Residential)
 St. Thomas Public School
 Gayatri Vidya Mandir
 Ram Krishna Vivekanand Vidyalaya
 Jharkhand Public School
 Sardar Ballabh Bhai Patel High School, Mahauri
 Manan Vidya, Mahuri, Bagodar
 Bhawna Edutech Tutorial, Block more, Bagodar
 Saraswati Vidya Niketan High School, Bagodar
 High School Hesla
 IDEAL PUBLIC SCHOOL

Main colonies
 Suriya Road 
 G.T Road, Sonturpi
 Mulla Muslim Mohalla
 Krishna Nagar
 Vivek Nagar
 Mahavir Nagar (Niche Bazaar, Bagodar)
 Ghaghra (Kasiyadih, Badkadih)
 Manjhaladih
 Atka (Laxibagi)
 Yamuna Nagar
 Hesla (Gendodih)
 Shiv Nagar
 Banpura
 Tirla (Aamtar)
 Mandhala Chowk NH-2,(G.T Road),
 KANDUTOLA NICHE BAZER BAGODAR

Cricket clubs
 Kranti Club Jarmune
 Sonturpi Club 
 Savera Sporting Club
 Mahavir Friends Club (Niche Bazar)
 Bagodardih Cricket Club
 Mahuri Cricket Club (G.T.Road)
 Ghaghra Cricket CLub (Kasiyadih)
 Five Star Club (Banpura)
 Tirla Cricket Club

Temples
 Harihardham (Baba Dham)
 Sri Shakti Mandir (Bagodar)
 Vaishno Devi Mandir
 Banhe Baba Jarmune
 Durgamata Mandir (Atkadih, DMUAA)
 Mahavir Mandir (Niche Bazaar)
 Gupt Nath Dham
 Sai Mandir, Bagodar
 Surya Mandir, Hazaribag Road, Bagodar
 Vaishno Devi Mandir, Hazaribag Road, Bagodar
 Sona Pahad, Beko
 Khataya Hanumaan Mandir
 Kali Mandir Tirla
 Khataya Pahadi Mandir

References

Villages in Giridih district